Sieveking is a surname. Notable people with the surname include:

Alejandro Sieveking (1934–2020), Chilean playwright, theatre director and actor
Amalie Sieveking (1794–1859), German philanthropist and social activist
Edward Henry Sieveking (1816–1904), British physician
Ed Sieveking, the protagonist of Lady of the Shades
Gale Sieveking (1925–2007), British archaeologist
Georg Heinrich Sieveking (1751–1799), German merchant and follower of the Enlightenment
Karl Sieveking (1787–1847), Syndicus of Hamburg, diplomat, politician, patron of the arts and philanthropist
Kurt Sieveking (1897–1986), German politician
Lance Sieveking (1896–1972), British writer and radio and television producer
Martinus Sieveking (1867–1950), Dutch virtuoso pianist, composer, teacher and inventor
Paul Sieveking (born 1949), British journalist and former magazine editor